RAF Appledram is a former Royal Air Force Advanced Landing Ground  southwest of Chichester, West Sussex and  east of Portsmouth, Hampshire.

History
The airfield was an Advanced Landing Ground for Operation Overlord (the invasion of German-occupied Europe) as part of 11 Group, RAF Fighter Command.

Posted units

Units

See also
List of former Royal Air Force stations

References

Citations

Bibliography

Royal Air Force stations in West Sussex
Royal Air Force stations of World War II in the United Kingdom